Hajji Tu (also Romanized as Ḩājjī Tū, Haji Too, and Ḩājītū) is a village in Qolqol Rud Rural District, Qolqol Rud District, Tuyserkan County, Hamadan Province, Iran. At the 2006 census, its population was 523, in 146 families.

References 

Populated places in Tuyserkan County